History of Ruthenians or Little Russia also known as History of the Rus' People is an anonymous historico-political treatise, most likely written at the break of the 18th and 19th centuries. It had a great influence on the formation of the Ukrainian national identity and was even named "the most prominent historical work in Ukraine". It was written and originally published in Russian and describes the history of the Ruthenians and their state, Little Russia (in the terminology of the book), from antiquity to 1769. It mostly focuses on the history of the Zaporizhian Sich and the Cossack Hetmanate.

Authorship and dating
The book was written as a political essay by an unknown author at the end of the 18th or early 19th century. According to Zenon Kohut, the author of the manuscript was strongly influenced by the events that had had place after the Third Partition of Poland. The "History" was distributed in the form of a manuscript for a long time and was published in Moscow University press by Osyp Bodianski only in 1846. The title page ascribed the work to ", Belorusian Archbishop". Subsequently, his authorship was seriously questioned, but the true author is not established. Another candidate (among others) is her Grand Chancellor Alexander Bezborodko.

Publications
Г. Конискій. Исторія Русовъ, или Малой Россіи. — М., 1846.
Історія Русів. Український переклад Івана Драча. Київ:Веселка, 2003.

Notes

References

External links
История Русов или Малой России. Moscow, 1846. Digital text of the first edition.
 History of the Rus people on the Encyclopedia of Ukraine website.
 History of Ruthenians on the Izbornyk website.

18th-century books
1846 books
History of Ruthenia
History books about Ukraine